General Mya Tun Oo (also spelt Mya Htun Oo) is a Burmese military officer and politician who serves as the incumbent  Deputy Prime Minister of Myanmar since 2023 February and Minister for Defence and member of the State Administration Council since 2021 February. He is also a member of the National Defence and Security Council as the Minister of Defence.

Early life and education 
Mya Tun Oo was born on 5 May 1961. He graduated in the Defence Services Academy's 25th intake in 1984.

Career 
Mya Tun Oo's rapid rise through the armed forces was noted by political observers, known for his professional record in both field combat and staff roles. By 2010, he was promoted to the rank of brigadier-general, serving as the rector of the Defence Services Academy, his alma mater. From 2011 to 2012, he served as the commander of the Eastern Central Command, which encompasses central Shan State. In 2012, he was promoted to the rank of major general, serving as the army's chief of staff, chief of military security affairs, and chief of the Bureau of Special Operations 6. From 2015 to 2017, he served as the head of Bureau of Operations - 5, which includes the Naypyidaw and Western Commands. On 26 August 2016, he was promoted to the rank of general, serving as the chief of general staff for the army, navy, and air force. After years of speculation, he was appointed by the Commander-in-Chief of Defence Services as the Minister for Defence on 1 February 2021.On the following day (2 February 2021), he was appointed as a member of the State Administration Council by the Commander-in-Chief of Defence Services.

Sanctions 
The U.S. Department of the Treasury has imposed sanctions on "Mya Tun Oo" since 11 February 2021, pursuant to Executive Order 14014, in response to the Burmese military’s coup against the democratically elected civilian government of Burma. The US sanctions include freezing of assets under the US and ban on transactions with US person.

The Government of Canada has imposed sanctions on him since 18 February 2021, pursuant to Special Economic Measures Act and Special Economic Measures (Burma) Regulations, in response to the gravity of the human rights and humanitarian situation in Myanmar (formerly Burma). Canadian sanctions include freezing of assets under Canada and ban on transactions with Canadian person.

HM Treasury and the Foreign, Commonwealth and Development Office of United Kingdom have also imposed sanctions on him since 18 February 2021, for his responsibility for serious human rights violations in Burma. The UK sanctions include freezing of assets under the UK and ban on traveling or transiting to the UK.

Furthermore, the Council of the European Union has imposed sanctions on him since 22 March 2021, pursuant to Council Regulation (EU) 2021/479 and Council Implementing Regulation (EU) 2021/480 which amended Council Regulation (EU) No 401/2013, for his responsibility for the military coup and the subsequent military and police repression against peaceful demonstrators. The EU sanctions include freezing of assets under member countries of the EU and ban on traveling or transiting to the countries.

Personal life 
Mya Tun Oo is married to Thet Thet Aung.

See also 
 State Administration Council
 Cabinet of Myanmar

References 

Living people
Government ministers of Myanmar
Defence Services Academy alumni
1961 births
Defence ministers of Myanmar
Burmese military personnel
Burmese generals
Members of the State Administration Council
Specially Designated Nationals and Blocked Persons List
Individuals related to Myanmar sanctions